The Southern Pacific Class Mt-5 is a class of  4-8-2 Mountain steam locomotives built between 1929 and 1930 by the Southern Pacific's own Sacramento shops. There were 10 locomotives built in the class. They were retired between 1953 and 1958. None survived into preservation.

References 

 
Steam locomotives of the United States
4-8-2 locomotives
Mt-5
Railway locomotives introduced in 1929
Standard gauge locomotives of the United States
Scrapped locomotives